Dolly Rebecca Parton (born January 19, 1946) is an American singer-songwriter, actress, philanthropist, and businesswoman, known primarily for her decades-long career in country music. After achieving success as a songwriter for others, Parton made her album debut in 1967 with Hello, I'm Dolly, which led to success during the remainder of the 1960s (both as a solo artist and with a series of duet albums with Porter Wagoner), before her sales and chart peak came during the 1970s and continued into the 1980s. Parton's albums in the 1990s did not sell as well, but she achieved commercial success again in the new millennium and has released albums on various independent labels since 2000, including her own label, Dolly Records.

With a career spanning over fifty years, Parton has been described as a "country music legend" and has sold more than 100 million records worldwide, making her one of the best-selling female artists of all time. Parton's music includes Recording Industry Association of America (RIAA)-certified gold, platinum and multi-platinum awards. She has had 25 singles reach no.1 on the Billboard country music charts, a record for a female artist (tied with Reba McEntire). She has 44 career Top10 country albums, a record for any artist, and she has 110 career-charted singles over the past 40 years. She has composed over 3,000 songs, including "I Will Always Love You" (a two-time U.S. country chart-topper, as well as an international pop hit for Whitney Houston), "Jolene", "Coat of Many Colors", and "9to5". As an actress, she has starred in films such as 9to5 (1980) and The Best Little Whorehouse in Texas (1982), for which she earned Golden Globe nominations for Best Actress, as well as Rhinestone (1984), Steel Magnolias (1989), Straight Talk (1992) and Joyful Noise (2012).

She has received 11 Grammy Awards out of 50 nominations, including the Lifetime Achievement Award; ten Country Music Association Awards, including Entertainer of the Year and is one of only seven female artists to win the Country Music Association's Entertainer of the Year Award; five Academy of Country Music Awards, also including Entertainer of the Year; four People's Choice Awards; and three American Music Awards. She is also in a select group to have received at least one nomination from the Academy Awards, Grammy Awards, Tony Awards, and Emmy Awards. In 1999, Parton was inducted into the Country Music Hall of Fame. In 2005, she received the National Medal of Arts and in 2022, she was nominated for the Rock and Roll Hall of Fame, a nomination she had initially declined, but ultimately accepted and was inducted.

Outside of her work in the music industry, she also co-owns The Dollywood Company, which manages a number of entertainment venues, including the Dollywood theme park, the Splash Country water park, and a number of dinner theatre venues including The Dolly Parton Stampede and Pirates Voyage.  She has founded a number of charitable and philanthropic organizations, chief among which is the Dollywood Foundation, which manages a number of projects to bring education and poverty relief to East Tennessee where she grew up.

Early life and career
Dolly Rebecca Parton was born January 19, 1946, in a one-room cabin on the banks of the Little Pigeon River in Pittman Center, Tennessee. 
She is the fourth of twelve children born to Avie Lee Caroline (née Owens; 1923–2003) and Robert Lee Parton Sr. (1921–2000). Parton's middle name comes from her maternal great-great-grandmother Rebecca (Dunn) Whitted. Parton's father, known as "Lee", worked in the mountains of East Tennessee, first as a sharecropper and later tending his own small tobacco farm and acreage. He also worked construction jobs to supplement the farm's small income. Despite her father's illiteracy, Parton has often commented that he was one of the smartest people she had ever known in regards to business and making a profit.

Parton's mother, Avie Lee, cared for their large family. Her 11 pregnancies (the tenth being twins) in 20 years made her a mother of 12 by age 35. Parton credits her musical abilities to her mother; often in poor health, she still managed to keep house and entertain her children with Smoky Mountain folklore and ancient ballads. Having Welsh ancestors, Avie Lee knew many old ballads that immigrants from the British Isles brought to southern Appalachia in the 18th and 19th century. Avie Lee's father, Jake Owens, was a Pentecostal preacher, and Parton and her siblings all attended church regularly. Parton has long credited her father for her business savvy, and her mother's family for her musical abilities. When Parton was a young girl, her family moved from the Pittman Center area to a farm up on nearby Locust Ridge. Most of her cherished memories of youth happened there. Today, a replica of the Locust Ridge cabin resides at Parton's namesake theme park Dollywood. The farm acreage and surrounding woodland inspired her to write the song "My Tennessee Mountain Home" in the 1970s. Years after the farm was sold, Parton bought it back in the late 1980s. Her brother Bobby helped with building restoration and new construction.

Parton has described her family as being "dirt poor". Parton's father paid missionary Dr. Robert F. Thomas with a sack of cornmeal for delivering her. Parton would write a song about Dr. Thomas when she was grown. She also outlined her family's poverty in her early songs "Coat of Many Colors" and "In the Good Old Days (When Times Were Bad)". For six or seven years, Parton and her family lived in their rustic, one-bedroom cabin on their small subsistence farm on Locust Ridge. This was a predominantly Pentecostal area located north of the Greenbrier Valley of the Great Smoky Mountains.
Music played an important role in her early life. She was brought up in the Church of God (Cleveland, Tennessee), in a congregation her grandfather, Jake Robert Owens, pastored. Her earliest public performances were in the church, beginning at age six. At seven, she started playing a homemade guitar. When she was eight, her uncle bought her first real guitar.

Parton began performing as a child, singing on local radio and television programs in the East Tennessee area. By ten, she was appearing on The Cas Walker Show on both WIVK Radio and WBIR-TV in Knoxville, Tennessee. At 13, she was recording (the single "Puppy Love") on a small Louisiana label, Goldband Records, and appeared at the Grand Ole Opry, where she first met Johnny Cash, who encouraged her to follow her own instincts regarding her career.

After graduating from Sevier County High School in 1964, Parton moved to Nashville the next day. Her initial success came as a songwriter, having signed with Combine Publishing shortly after her arrival; with her frequent songwriting partner, her uncle Bill Owens, she wrote several charting singles during this time, including two Top10 hits for Bill Phillips: "Put It Off Until Tomorrow," and "The Company You Keep" (1966), and Skeeter Davis's number 11 hit "Fuel to the Flame" (1967). Her songs were recorded by many other artists during this period, including Kitty Wells and Hank Williams Jr. She signed with Monument Records in 1965, at age 19; she initially was pitched as a bubblegum pop singer. She released a string of singles, but the only one that charted, "Happy, Happy Birthday Baby", did not crack the Billboard Hot 100. Although she expressed a desire to record country material, Monument resisted, thinking her unique, high soprano voice was not suited to the genre.

After her composition "Put It Off Until Tomorrow", as recorded by Bill Phillips (with Parton, uncredited, on harmony), went to number six on the country chart in 1966, the label relented and allowed her to record country. Her first country single, "Dumb Blonde" (composed by Curly Putman, one of the few songs during this era that she recorded but did not write), reached number 24 on the country chart in 1967, followed by "Something Fishy", which went to number 17. The two songs appeared on her first full-length album, Hello, I'm Dolly.

Music career

1967–1975: Country music success

In 1967, musician and country music entertainer Porter Wagoner invited Parton to join his organization, offering her a regular spot on his weekly syndicated television program The Porter Wagoner Show, and in his road show. As documented in her 1994 autobiography, initially, much of Wagoner's audience was unhappy that Norma Jean, the performer whom Parton had replaced, had left the show, and was reluctant to accept Parton (sometimes chanting loudly for Norma Jean from the audience). With Wagoner's assistance, however, Parton was eventually accepted. Wagoner convinced his label, RCA Victor, to sign her. RCA decided to protect their investment by releasing her first single as a duet with Wagoner. That song, a remake of Tom Paxton's "The Last Thing on My Mind", released in late 1967, reached the country Top10 in January 1968, launching a six-year streak of virtually uninterrupted Top10 singles for the pair.

Parton's first solo single for RCA Victor, "Just Because I'm a Woman", was released in the summer of 1968 and was a moderate chart hit, reaching number 17. For the next two years, none of her solo effortseven "In the Good Old Days (When Times Were Bad)", which later became a standardwere as successful as her duets with Wagoner. The duo was named Vocal Group of the Year in 1968 by the Country Music Association, but Parton's solo records were continually ignored. Wagoner had a significant financial stake in her future; as of 1969, he was her co-producer and owned nearly half of Owe-Par, the publishing company Parton had founded with Bill Owens.

By 1970, both Parton and Wagoner had grown frustrated by her lack of solo chart success. Wagoner persuaded Parton to record Jimmie Rodgers' "Mule Skinner Blues", a gimmick that worked. The record shot to number three, followed closely, in February 1971, by her first number-one single, "Joshua". For the next two years, she had numerous solo hitsincluding her signature song "Coat of Many Colors" (number four, 1971)in addition to her duets. Top20 singles included "The Right Combination" and "Burning the Midnight Oil" (both duets with Wagoner, 1971); "Lost Forever in Your Kiss" (with Wagoner), "Touch Your Woman" (1972), "My Tennessee Mountain Home" and "Travelin' Man" (1973).

Although her solo singles and the Wagoner duets were successful, her biggest hit of this period was "Jolene". Released in late 1973, it topped the country chart in February 1974 and reached the lower regions of the Hot 100 (it eventually also charted in the U.K., reaching number seven in 1976, representing Parton's first U.K. success). Parton, who had always envisioned a solo career, made the decision to leave Wagoner's organization; the pair performed their last duet concert in April 1974, and she stopped appearing on his TV show in mid-1974, although they remained affiliated. He helped produce her records through 1975. The pair continued to release duet albums, their final release being 1975's Say Forever You'll Be Mine.

In 1974, her song, "I Will Always Love You", written about her professional break from Wagoner, went to number one on the country chart. Around the same time, Elvis Presley indicated that he wanted to record the song. Parton was interested until Presley's manager, Colonel Tom Parker, told her that it was standard procedure for the songwriter to sign over half of the publishing rights to any song recorded by Presley. Parton refused. That decision has been credited with helping to make her many millions of dollars in royalties from the song over the years. Parton had three solo singles reach number one on the country chart in 1974 ("Jolene", "I Will Always Love You" and "Love Is Like a Butterfly"), as well as the duet with Porter Wagoner, "Please Don't Stop Loving Me". In a 2019 episode of the Sky Arts music series Brian Johnson: A Life on the Road, Parton described finding old cassette tapes and realizing that she had composed both "Jolene" and "I Will Always Love You" in the same songwriting session, telling Johnson "Buddy, that was a good night." Parton again topped the singles chart in 1975 with "The Bargain Store".

1976–1986: Pop transition

Between 1974 and 1980 Parton had a series of country hits, with eight singles reaching number one. Her influence on pop culture is reflected by the many performers covering her songs, including mainstream and crossover artists such as Olivia Newton-John, Emmylou Harris, and Linda Ronstadt.

Parton began to embark on a high-profile crossover campaign, attempting to aim her music in a more mainstream direction and increase her visibility outside of the confines of country music. In 1976, she began working closely with Sandy Gallin, who served as her personal manager for the next 25 years. With her 1976 album All I Can Do, which she co-produced with Porter Wagoner, Parton began taking more of an active role in production, and began specifically aiming her music in a more mainstream, pop direction. Her first entirely self-produced effort, New Harvest...First Gathering (1977), highlighted her pop sensibilities, both in terms of choice of songs – the album contained covers of the pop and R&B classics "My Girl" and "Higher and Higher" – and production. Though the album was well received and topped the U.S. country albums chart, neither it nor its single "Light of a Clear Blue Morning" made much of an impression on the pop charts.

After New Harvest disappointing crossover performance, Parton turned to high-profile pop producer Gary Klein for her next album. The result, 1977's Here You Come Again, became her first million-seller, topping the country album chart and reaching number 20 on the pop chart. The Barry Mann-Cynthia Weil-penned title track topped the country singles chart, and became Parton's first Top10 single on the pop chart (no.3). A second single, the double A-sided "Two Doors Down"/"It's All Wrong, But It's All Right" topped the country chart and crossed over to the pop Top20. For the remainder of the 1970s and into the early 1980s, many of her subsequent singles moved up on both charts simultaneously. Her albums during this period were developed specifically for pop-crossover success.

In 1978, Parton won a Grammy Award for Best Female Country Vocal Performance for her Here You Come Again album. She continued to have hits with "Heartbreaker" (1978), "Baby I'm Burning" (1979) and "You're the Only One" (1979)all of which charted in the pop Top 40 and topped the country chart. "Sweet Summer Lovin'" (1979) became the first Parton single in two years to not top the country chart (though it did reach the Top10). During this period, her visibility continued to increase, with multiple television appearances. A highly publicized candid interview on a Barbara Walters Special in 1977 (timed to coincide with Here You Come Again release) was followed by appearances in 1978 on Cher's ABC television special, and her own joint special with Carol Burnett on CBS, Dolly & Carol in Nashville.

Parton served as one of three co-hosts (along with Roy Clark and Glen Campbell) on the CBS special Fifty Years of Country Music. In 1979, Parton hosted the NBC special The Seventies: An Explosion of Country Music, performed live at the Ford Theatre in Washington, D.C., and whose audience included President Jimmy Carter.
Her commercial success grew in 1980, with three consecutive country chart number-one hits: the Donna Summer-written "Starting Over Again", "Old Flames Can't Hold a Candle to You", and "9to5", which topped the country and pop charts in early 1981. She had another Top10 single that year with "Making Plans", a single released from a 1980 album with Porter Wagoner, released as part of a lawsuit settlement between the pair.

The theme song to the 1980 feature film 9to5, in which she starred along with Jane Fonda and Lily Tomlin, not only reached number one on the country chartin February 1981 it reached number one on the pop and the adult-contemporary charts, giving her a triple number-one hit. Parton became one of the few female country singers to have a number-one single on the country and pop charts simultaneously. It also received a nomination for an Academy Award for Best Original Song. Her singles continued to appear consistently in the country Top10. Between 1981 and 1985, she had twelve Top10 hits; half of them hit number one. She continued to make inroads on the pop chart as well. A re-recorded version of "I Will Always Love You", from the feature film The Best Little Whorehouse in Texas (1982) scraped the Top50 that year and her duet with Kenny Rogers, "Islands in the Stream" (written by the Bee Gees and produced by Barry Gibb), spent two weeks at number one in 1983.

In the mid-1980s, her record sales were still relatively strong, with "Save the Last Dance for Me", "Tennessee Homesick Blues", "God Won't Get You" (1984), "Real Love" (another duet with Kenny Rogers), "Don't Call It Love" (1985) and "Think About Love" (1986) all reaching the country Top10 ("Tennessee Homesick Blues" and "Think About Love" reached number one; "Real Love" also reached number one on the country chart and became a modest crossover hit). However, RCA Records did not renew her contract after it expired in 1986, and she signed with Columbia Records in 1987.

1987–2005: Country and bluegrass period
Along with Emmylou Harris and Linda Ronstadt, she released Trio (1987) to critical acclaim. The album revitalized Parton's music career, spending five weeks at number one on Billboard's Country Albums chart, and also reached the Top10 on Billboard Top200 Albums chart. It sold several million copies and produced four Top10 country hits, including Phil Spector's "To Know Him Is to Love Him", which went to number one. Trio won the Grammy Award for Best Country Performance by a Duo or Group with Vocal and was nominated for a Grammy Award for Album of the Year. After a further attempt at pop success with Rainbow (1987), including the single "The River Unbroken", it ended up a commercial let-down, causing Parton to focus on recording country material. White Limozeen (1989) produced two number one hits in "Why'd You Come in Here Lookin' Like That" and "Yellow Roses". Although Parton's career appeared to be revived, it was actually just a brief revival before contemporary country music came in the early 1990s and moved most veteran artists off the charts.

A duet with Ricky Van Shelton, "Rockin' Years" (1991) reached number one, though Parton's greatest commercial fortune of the decade came when Whitney Houston recorded "I Will Always Love You" for the soundtrack of the feature film The Bodyguard (1992). Both the single and the album were massively successful. Parton's soundtrack album from the 1992 film, Straight Talk, however, was less successful. But her 1993 album Slow Dancing with the Moon won critical acclaim and did well on the charts, reaching number four on the country albums chart, and number 16 on the Billboard 200 album chart. She recorded "The Day I Fall in Love" as a duet with James Ingram for the feature film Beethoven's 2nd (1993). The songwriters (Ingram, Carole Bayer Sager, and Clif Magness) were nominated for an Academy Award for Best Original Song, and Parton and Ingram performed the song at the awards telecast. Similar to her earlier collaborative album with Harris and Ronstadt, Parton released Honky Tonk Angels in the fall of 1993 with Loretta Lynn and Tammy Wynette. It was certified as a gold album by the Recording Industry Association of America and helped revive both Wynette and Lynn's careers. Also in 1994, Parton contributed the song "You Gotta Be My Baby" to the AIDS benefit album Red Hot + Country produced by the Red Hot Organization. A live acoustic album, Heartsongs: Live from Home, featuring stripped-down versions of some of her hits, as well as some traditional songs, was released in late 1994.

Parton's recorded music during the mid-to-late-1990s remained steady and somewhat eclectic. Her 1995 re-recording of "I Will Always Love You" (performed as a duet with Vince Gill), from her album Something Special won the Country Music Association's Vocal Event of the Year Award. The following year, Treasures, an album of covers of 1960s/70s hits was released, and featured a diverse collection of material, including songs by Mac Davis, Pete Seeger, Kris Kristofferson, Cat Stevens, and Neil Young. Her recording of Stevens' "Peace Train" was later re-mixed and released as a dance single, reaching Billboard's dance singles chart. Her 1998 country-rock album Hungry Again was made up entirely of her own compositions. Although neither of the album's two singles, "(Why Don't More Women Sing) Honky Tonk Songs" and "Salt in my Tears", charted, videos for both songs received significant airplay on CMT. A second and more contemporary collaboration with Harris and Ronstadt, Trio II, was released in early 1999. Its cover of Neil Young's song "After the Gold Rush" won a Grammy Award for Best Country Collaboration with Vocals. Parton also was inducted into the Country Music Hall of Fame in 1999.

Parton recorded a series of bluegrass-inspired albums, beginning with The Grass Is Blue (1999), winning a Grammy Award for Best Bluegrass Album; and Little Sparrow (2001), with its cover of Collective Soul's "Shine" winning a Grammy Award for Best Female Country Vocal Performance. The third, Halos & Horns (2002) included a bluegrass version of the Led Zeppelin song "Stairway to Heaven". In 2005, she released Those Were The Days consisting of her interpretations of hits from the folk-rock era of the late 1960s and early 1970s, including "Imagine", "Where Do the Children Play?", "Crimson and Clover", and "Where Have All the Flowers Gone?"

2005–2020: Touring and holiday album

Parton earned her second Academy Award nomination for Best Original Song for "Travelin' Thru", which she wrote specifically for the feature film Transamerica. (2005) Due to the song's (and film's) acceptance of a transgender woman, Parton received death threats. She returned to number one on the country chart later in 2005 by lending her distinctive harmonies to the Brad Paisley ballad, "When I Get Where I'm Going". In September 2007, Parton released her first single from her own record company, Dolly Records, titled, "Better Get to Livin'", which eventually peaked at number 48 on Billboard Hot Country Songs chart. It was followed by the studio album Backwoods Barbie, which was released on February 26, 2008, and reached number two on the country chart. The album's debut at number 17 on the all-genre Billboard 200 albums chart was the highest in her career. Backwoods Barbie produced four additional singles, including the title track, written as part of her score for 9to5: The Musical, an adaptation of her feature film. After the death of Michael Jackson, whom Parton knew personally, she released a video in which she somberly told of her feelings on Jackson and his death.

On October 27, 2009, Parton released a four-CD box set, Dolly, which featured 99 songs and spanned most of her career. She released her second live DVD and album, Live From London in October 2009, which was filmed during her sold-out 2008 concerts at London's The O2 Arena. On August 10, 2010, with longtime friend Billy Ray Cyrus, Parton released the album Brother Clyde. Parton is featured on "The Right Time", which she co-wrote with Cyrus and Morris Joseph Tancredi. On January 6, 2011, Parton announced that her new album would be titled Better Day. In February 2011, she announced that she would embark on the Better Day World Tour on July 17, 2011, with shows in northern Europe and the U.S. The album's lead-off single, "Together You and I", was released on May 23, 2011, and Better Day was released on June 28, 2011. In 2011, Parton voiced the character Dolly Gnome in the animated film Gnomeo & Juliet. On February 11, 2012, after the sudden death of Whitney Houston, Parton stated, "Mine is only one of the millions of hearts broken over the death of Whitney Houston. I will always be grateful and in awe of the wonderful performance she did on my song, and I can truly say from the bottom of my heart, 'Whitney, I will always love you. You will be missed.

In 2013 Parton joined Lulu Roman for a re-recording of "I Will Always Love You" for Roman's album, At Last. In 2013, Parton and Kenny Rogers reunited for the title song of his album You Can't Make Old Friends. For their performance, they were nominated at the 2014 Grammy Awards for Grammy Award for Best Country Duo/Group Performance. In 2014, Parton embarked on the Blue Smoke World Tour in support of her 42nd studio album, Blue Smoke. The album was first released in Australia and New Zealand on January 31 to coincide with tour dates there in February, and reached the Top10 in both countries. It was released in the United States on May 13, and debuted at number six on the Billboard 200 chart, making it her first Top10 album and her highest-charting solo album ever; it also reached the number two on the U.S. country chart. The album was released in Europe on June 9, and reached number two on the UK album chart. On June 29, 2014, Parton performed for the first time at the UK Glastonbury Festival performing songs such as "Jolene", "9to5" and "Coat of Many Colors" to a crowd of more than 180,000. On March 6, 2016, Parton announced that she would be embarking on a tour in support of her new album, Pure & Simple. The tour was one of Parton's biggest tours within the United States in more than 25 years. Sixty-four dates were planned in the United States and Canada, visiting the most requested markets missed on previous tours.

In the fall of 2016 she released "Jolene" as a single with the a cappella group Pentatonix and performed on The Voice with Pentatonix and Miley Cyrus in November 2016. Also in 2016, Parton was one of thirty artists to perform on "Forever Country", a mash-up of the songs, "Take Me Home, Country Roads", "On the Road Again" and her own "I Will Always Love You". The song celebrates fifty years of the CMA Awards. At the ceremony itself, Parton was honored with the Willie Nelson Lifetime Achievement Award, which was presented by Lily Tomlin and preceded by a tribute featuring Jennifer Nettles, Pentatonix, Reba McEntire, Kacey Musgraves, Carrie Underwood and Martina McBride. In 2017, Parton appeared on Rainbow, the third studio album by Kesha performing a duet of "Old Flames Can't Hold a Candle to You". The track had been co-written by Kesha's mother Pebe Sebert. It was previously a hit for Parton and was included on her 1980 album Dolly, Dolly, Dolly. She also co-wrote and provided featuring vocals on the song "Rainbowland" on Younger Now, the sixth album by her goddaughter Miley Cyrus.

In July 2019, Parton made an unannounced appearance at the Newport Folk Festival in Rhode Island, and performed several songs accompanied by the Highwomen and Linda Perry. In 2020, Parton received worldwide attention after posting four pictures in which she showed how she would present herself on the social media platforms LinkedIn, Facebook, Instagram and Twitter. The original post on Instagram went viral after celebrities posted their own versions of the so-called Dolly Parton challenge on social media. On April 10, 2020, Parton re-released 93 songs from six of her classic albums. Little Sparrow, Halos & Horns, For God and Country, Better Day, Those Were The Days, and Live and Well are all available for online listening. On May 27, 2020, Parton released a brand new song called "When Life Is Good Again". This song was released to help keep the spirits up of those affected by the 2020 COVID-19 pandemic. Parton also released a music video for "When Life Is Good Again" which premiered on Time 100 talks on May 28, 2020.

In August 2020 Parton announced plans to release her first holiday album in 30 years, A Holly Dolly Christmas, in October 2020. On December 6, CBS aired a Christmas special, "A Holly Dolly Christmas", where Parton performed songs from her album.

2022–present: Rock album

In early 2022, she was nominated for induction into the Rock and Roll Hall of Fame. Parton initially declined the nomination believing that the Rock and Roll Hall of Fame was "for the people in rock music", but after learning that this was not the case Parton said she would accept her induction if she were chosen for the honor. In May her induction was announced, and finally on November 5, 2022 she was inducted into the Rock and Roll Hall of Fame. In October 2022 Parton stated in an interview that she would no longer tour, but would continue to play live shows occasionally. On December 31, 2022, Parton co-hosted NBC's New Year's special Miley's New Year's Eve Party.

On January 17, 2023, Parton announced she would release her first rock album, entitled Rock Star, later that year, during an interview on The View.

Public image
Parton had turned down several offers to pose nude for Playboy magazine, but did appear on the cover of the October 1978 issue wearing a Playboy bunny outfit, complete with ears (the issue featured Lawrence Grobel's extensive and candid interview with Parton, representing one of her earliest high-profile interviews with the mainstream press). The association of breasts with Parton's public image is illustrated in the naming of Dolly the sheep after her, since the sheep was cloned from a cell taken from an adult ewe's mammary gland. In Mobile, Alabama, the General W.K. Wilson Jr. Bridge is commonly called "the Dolly Parton Bridge" due to its arches resembling her bust. The thickened appearance of the turret frontal armor of the T-72A main battle tank led to the unofficial Army nickname "Dolly Parton" - and later the T-72BI's got the "Super Dolly Parton" nickname

Parton is known for having undergone considerable plastic surgery. On a 2003 episode of The Oprah Winfrey Show, Winfrey asked what kind of cosmetic surgery Parton had undergone. Parton replied that cosmetic surgery was imperative in keeping with her famous image.
Parton has repeatedly joked about her physical image and surgeries, saying, "It takes a lot of money to look this cheap." Her breasts have garnered her mentions in several songs, including "Dolly Parton's Hits" by Bobby Braddock, "Marty Feldman Eyes" by Bruce Baum (a parody of "Bette Davis Eyes"), "No Show Jones" by George Jones and Merle Haggard, and "Make Me Proud" by Drake, featuring Nicki Minaj. When asked about future plastic surgeries, she famously said, "If I see something sagging, bagging or dragging, I'll get it nipped, tucked or sucked." Parton's feminine escapism is acknowledged in her words, "Womanhood was a difficult thing to get a grip on in those hills, unless you were a man." Parton said in 2012 that she had entered a Dolly Parton lookalike contest and lost.

Artistry

Influences 
Parton, though influenced by big name stars, often credits much of her inspiration to her family and community. On her own mother Parton, in her 2020 book Songteller: My Life in Lyrics, wrote "So it was just natural for my mom to always be singing. My mother had that old-timey voice, and she used to sing all these songs that were brought over from the Old World. They were English, Irish, Welsh, folk songs where people tell stories." Parton calls her mother's voice "haunting". "Lord you would feel it", she wrote. Her biggest influence however was her Aunt Dorothy Jo: "People often ask me who my influences were, they think I'm going to say some big names, and there were a few 'stars' I was impressed with. But my hero was my aunt Dorothy Jo. Mama's baby sister. She was not only an evangelist, she played banjo, she played guitar, and she wrote some great songs." Of course, fellow singers also had an impact on Parton, describing George Jones as her "all time favorite singer", and recognizing her love for other artists such as Kitty Wells, Roy Acuff, and Rose Maddox.

Musicianship 
Though unable to read sheet music, Parton can play many instruments, including: the dulcimer, autoharp, banjo, guitar, electric guitar, fiddle, piano, recorder, and the saxophone. Reflecting on her multi-instrumental abilities, Parton said, "I play some of everything. I ain't that good at none of it, but I try to sell it. I really try to lay into it." Parton has also used her fingernails as an instrument, most evident on her 1980 song "9 to 5", which she derived the beat for from clacking her nails together while backstage on the set of the film of the same name.

Other ventures
In 1998, Nashville Business ranked her the wealthiest country music star. , her net worth is estimated at $500million.

Songwriting
Parton is a prolific songwriter, having begun by writing country music songs with strong elements of folk music, based on her upbringing in humble mountain surroundings and reflecting her family's Christian background. Her songs "Coat of Many Colors", "I Will Always Love You", and "Jolene", among others, have become classics. On November 4, 2003, Parton was honored as a BMI Icon at the 2003 BMI Country Awards.
Parton has earned over 35 BMI Pop and Country Awards. In 2001, she was inducted into the Songwriters Hall of Fame. In a 2009 interview on CNN's Larry King Live, she said she had written "at least 3,000" songs, having written seriously since the age of seven. Parton also said she writes something every day, be it a song or an idea.

Parton's songwriting has been featured prominently in several films. In addition to the title song for 9to5, she also recorded a second version of "I Will Always Love You" for The Best Little Whorehouse in Texas (1982). The second version was a number one country hit and also reached number 53 on the pop charts.
"I Will Always Love You" has been covered by many country artists, including Ronstadt on Prisoner In Disguise (1975), Kenny Rogers on Vote for Love (1996), and LeAnn Rimes on Unchained Melody: The Early Years (1997). Whitney Houston performed it on The Bodyguard soundtrack and her version became the best-selling hit both written and performed by a female vocalist, with worldwide sales of over twelve million copies. In addition, the song has been translated into Italian and performed by the Welsh opera singer Katherine Jenkins.

As a songwriter, Parton has twice been nominated for an Academy Award for Best Original Song, for "9 to 5" and "Travelin' Thru" (2005) from the film Transamerica. "Travelin' Thru" won Best Original Song at the 2005 Phoenix Film Critics Society Awards. It was also nominated for both the 2005 Golden Globe Award for Best Original Song and the 2005 Broadcast Film Critics Association Award (also known as the Critics' Choice Awards) for Best Song. A cover of "Love Is Like A Butterfly" by Clare Torry was used as the theme music for the British TV show Butterflies.

9 to 5: The Musical

Parton wrote the score (and Patricia Resnick the book) for 9 to 5: The Musical, a musical-theater adaptation of Parton's feature film 9 to 5 (1980). The musical ran at the Ahmanson Theatre, Los Angeles in late 2008. It opened on Broadway at the Marquis Theatre in New York City, on April 30, 2009, to mixed reviews.
The title track of her 2008 album Backwoods Barbie was written for the musical's character Doralee. Although her score (as well as the musical debut of actress Allison Janney) was praised, the show struggled, closing on September 6, 2009, after 24 previews and 148 performances. Parton received nominations for Drama Desk Award for Outstanding Music and Drama Desk Award for Outstanding Lyrics, as well as a nomination for Tony Award for Best Original Score.
Developing the musical was not a quick process. According to the public-radio program Studio 360 (October 29, 2005), in October 2005 Parton was in the midst of composing the songs for a Broadway musical theater adaptation of the film. In late June 2007, 9 to 5: The Musical was read for industry presentations. The readings starred Megan Hilty, Allison Janney, Stephanie J. Block, Bebe Neuwirth, and Marc Kudisch. Ambassador Theatre Group announced a 2012 UK tour for Dolly Parton's 9to5: The Musical, commencing at Manchester Opera House, on October 12, 2012.

The Dollywood Company

Parton invested much of her earnings into business ventures in her native East Tennessee, notably Pigeon Forge. She is a co-owner of The Dollywood Company, which operates the theme park Dollywood (a former Silver Dollar City), a dinner theater, Dolly Parton's Stampede, the waterpark Dollywood's Splash Country, and the Dream More Resort and Spa, all in Pigeon Forge. Dollywood is the 24th-most-popular theme park in the United States, with three million visitors per year.
The Dolly Parton's Stampede business has venues in Branson, Missouri, and Myrtle Beach, South Carolina. A former location in Orlando, Florida, closed in January 2008 after the land and building were sold to a developer. Starting in June 2011, the Myrtle Beach location became Pirates Voyage Fun, Feast and Adventure; Parton appeared for the opening, and the South Carolina General Assembly declared June 3, 2011, as Dolly Parton Day.

On January 19, 2012, Parton's 66th birthday, Gaylord Opryland and Dollywood announced plans to open a $50million water and snow park, a family-friendly destination in Nashville that is open all year. On September 29, 2012, Parton officially withdrew her support for the Nashville park due to the restructuring of Gaylord Entertainment Company after its merger with Marriott International.
On June 12, 2015, it was announced that the Dollywood Company had purchased the Lumberjack Feud Dinner Show in Pigeon Forge. The show, which opened in June 2011, was owned and operated by Rob Scheer until the close of the 2015 season. The new, renovated show by the Dollywood Company opened in 2016.

Production work
Parton was a co-owner of Sandollar Productions, with Sandy Gallin, her former manager. A film and television production company, it produced the documentary Common Threads: Stories from the Quilt (1989), which won an Academy Award for Best Documentary (Feature); the television series Babes (1990–91) and Buffy the Vampire Slayer (1997–2003); and the feature films Father of the Bride (1991), Father of the Bride: Part II (1995) Straight Talk (1992) (in which Parton starred), and Sabrina (1995), among other shows. In a 2009 interview, singer Connie Francis revealed that Dolly had been contacting her for years in an attempt to film the singer's life story. Francis turned down Parton's offers, as she was already in negotiations with singer Gloria Estefan to produce the film, a collaboration now ended. After the retirement of her partner, Sandy Gallin, Parton briefly operated Dolly Parton's Southern Light Productions and in 2015 she announced her new production company would be called Dixie Pixie Productions and produce the movies-of-week in development with NBC Television and Magnolia Hill Productions.

Acting career

Acting breakthrough
In addition to her performing appearances on The Porter Wagoner Show in the 1960s and into the 1970s, her two self-titled television variety shows in the 1970s and 1980s, and on American Idol in 2008 and other guest appearances, Parton has had television roles. In 1979, she received an Emmy award nomination as "Outstanding Supporting Actress in a Variety Program" for her guest appearance in a Cher special. During the mid-1970s, Parton wanted to expand her audience base. Although her first attempt, the television variety show Dolly! (1976–77), had high ratings, it lasted only one season, with Parton requesting to be released from her contract because of the stress it was causing on her vocal cords (she later tried a second television variety show, also titled Dolly (1987–88); it too lasted only one season).

In her first feature film, Parton portrayed a secretary in a leading role with Jane Fonda and Lily Tomlin in the comedy film 9to5 (1980). The movie highlights discrimination against women in the workplace and created awareness of the National Association of Working Women (9–5). She received nominations for a Golden Globe Award for Best Actress – Motion Picture Musical or Comedy and a Golden Globe Award for New Star of the Year – Actress. Parton wrote and recorded the film's title song. It received nominations for an Academy Award for Best Song and a Golden Globe Award for Best Original Song. Released as a single, the song won both the Grammy Award for Best Female Country Vocal Performance and the Grammy Award for Best Country Song. It also reached no.1 on the Hot 100 chart and it was no.78 on the "AFI's 100 Years...100 Songs" list released by the American Film Institute in 2004. 9 to 5 became a major box office success, grossing over $3.9million its opening weekend, and over $103million worldwide. Parton was named Top Female Box Office Star by the Motion Picture Herald in both 1981 and 1982 due to the film's success.

In late 1981, Parton began filming her second film, the musical film The Best Little Whorehouse in Texas (1982). The film earned her a second nomination for a Golden Globe Award for Best ActressMotion Picture Musical or Comedy. The film was greeted with positive critical reviews and became a commercial success, earning over $69million worldwide. After a two-year hiatus from films, Parton was teamed with Sylvester Stallone for Rhinestone (1984). A comedy film about a country music star's efforts to mould an unknown into a music sensation, the film was a critical and financial failure, making just over $21million on a $28million budget.

Continued roles
In 1989, Parton returned to film acting in Steel Magnolias (1989), based on the play of the same name by Robert Harling. The film was popular with critics and audiences, grossing over $95million inside the U.S. She starred in the television movies A Smoky Mountain Christmas (1986); Wild Texas Wind (1991); Unlikely Angel (1996), portraying an angel sent back to earth following a deadly car crash; and Blue Valley Songbird (1999), where her character lives through her music. Parton starred along with James Woods in Straight Talk (1992), which received mixed reviews, and grossed a mild $21million at the box office.

Parton's 1987 variety show Dolly lasted only one season. She made a cameo appearance as herself in The Beverly Hillbillies (1993), an adaptation of the long-running TV sitcom of the same name (1962–71). Parton has done voice work for animation for television series, playing herself in Alvin and the Chipmunks (episode "Urban Chipmunk", 1983) and the character Katrina Eloise "Murph" Murphy (Ms. Frizzle's first cousin) in The Magic School Bus (episode "The Family Holiday Special", 1994). She also has guest-starred in several sitcoms, including a 1990 episode of Designing Women (episode "The First Day of the Last Decade of the Entire Twentieth Century") as herself, the guardian movie star of Charlene's baby. She made a guest appearance on Reba (episode "Reba's Rules of Real Estate") portraying a real-estate agency owner and on The Simpsons (episode "Sunday, Cruddy Sunday", 1999). She appeared as herself in 2000 on the Halloween episode of Bette Midler's short-lived sitcom Bette, and on episode 14 of Babes (produced by Sandollar Productions, Parton and Sandy Gallin's joint production company). She made cameo appearances on the Disney Channel as "Aunt Dolly", visiting Hannah and her family in fellow Tennessean and real-life goddaughter Miley Cyrus's series Hannah Montana (episodes "Good Golly, Miss Dolly", 2006, "I Will Always Loathe You", 2007, and "Kiss It All Goodbye", 2010). She was nominated for Outstanding Guest Actress in a Comedy Series.

Parton appeared as an overprotective mother in the comedy Frank McKlusky, C.I.. (2002) She made a cameo appearance in the comedy film Miss Congeniality 2: Armed and Fabulous, starring Sandra Bullock. She was featured in The Book Lady (2008), a documentary about her campaign for children's literacy. Parton expected to reprise her television role as Hannah's godmother in the musical comedy film Hannah Montana: The Movie (2009), but the character was omitted from the screenplay. She had a voice role in the comedy family film Gnomeo & Juliet (2011), a computer-animated film with garden gnomes about William Shakespeare's Romeo and Juliet.

Recent work
Parton co-starred with Queen Latifah in the musical film Joyful Noise (2012), playing a choir director's widow who joins forces with Latifah's character, a mother of two teens, to save a small Georgia town's gospel choir.

Dolly Parton's Coat of Many Colors, a made-for-TV film based on Parton's song of the same name, and featuring narration by Parton, aired on NBC in December 2015, with child actress Alyvia Alyn Lind portraying the young Parton. Parton also had a cameo in the sequel, which aired in November 2016. 

In June 2018, Parton announced an eight-part Netflix series, featuring her music career. She is its executive producer and co-star. The series, called Dolly Parton's Heartstrings, aired in November 2019.

Parton is the subject of the NPR podcast Dolly Parton's America. It is hosted by Jad Abumrad, who also hosts Radiolab.

In December 2019, the biographical documentary Here I Am was added to the catalog of the Netflix streaming service. The documentary, a co-production of Netflix and the BBC, takes its name from Parton's 1971 song.

In November 2020, Parton produced and starred in the Netflix musical film Dolly Parton's Christmas on the Square, which won her a Primetime Emmy Award for Outstanding Television Movie.

In November 2021, Parton was confirmed to be appearing in the final season of Grace and Frankie in a guest-starring role, reuniting with her 9 to 5 co-stars Lily Tomlin and Jane Fonda.

In July 2022, Parton appeared as a simulation of herself on sci-fi show The Orville in the episode "Midnight Blue".

In December 2022, Parton appeared in an NBC special titled "Dolly Parton's Mountain Magic Christmas."

Personal life

Family
Parton is the fourth of 12 children. Her siblings are Willadeene, David Wilburn, Coy Denver, Robert Lee, Stella Mae, Cassie Nan, Randel Huston (deceased), Larry Gerald (deceased), twins Floyd Estel (deceased) and Frieda Estelle, and Rachel Ann.

On May 30, 1966, Parton and Carl Thomas Dean (born July 20, 1942, in Nashville, Tennessee) were married in Ringgold, Georgia. Although Parton does not use Dean's surname professionally, she has stated that her passport reads "Dolly Parton Dean" and that she sometimes uses Dean when signing contracts.
Dean, who is retired from running an asphalt road-paving business in Nashville, has always shunned publicity and rarely accompanies his wife to any events. Parton has jokingly said he has only seen her perform once. She also has said in interviews that, although it appears they spend little time together, it is simply that nobody sees him publicly. She has commented on Dean's romantic side, saying that he does spontaneous things to surprise her and sometimes even writes poems for her. In 2011, Parton said, "We're really very proud of our marriage. It's the first for both of us. And the last."

On May 6, 2016, Parton announced that she and her husband would renew their vows in honor of their 50th wedding anniversary later in the month.

Parton and Dean helped raise several of Parton's younger siblings in Nashville, leading her nieces and nephews to refer to them as "Uncle Peepaw" and "Aunt Granny"; the latter a moniker that later lent its name to one of Parton's Dollywood restaurants. Parton is the godmother of singer-songwriter and actress Miley Cyrus.

Philanthropy
Since the mid-1980s, Parton has supported many charitable efforts, particularly in the area of literacy, primarily through her Dollywood Foundation.
Her literacy program, Dolly Parton's Imagination Library, a part of the Dollywood Foundation, mails one book per month to each enrolled child from the time of their birth until they enter kindergarten. Currently, over 1600 local communities provide the Imagination Library to almost 850,000 children each month across the U.S., Canada, the UK, Australia, and the Republic of Ireland. In 2018, Parton was honored by the Library of Congress on account of the "charity sending out its 100 millionth book".
In 2006, Parton published a cookbook, Dolly's Dixie Fixin's: Love, Laughter and Lots of Good Food.

The Dollywood Foundation, funded from Parton's profits, has been noted for bringing jobs and tax revenues to a previously depressed region. Parton also has worked to raise money for several other causes, including the American Red Cross and HIV/AIDS-related charities.

In December 2006, Parton pledged $500,000 toward a proposed $90million hospital and cancer center to be constructed in Sevierville in the name of Robert F. Thomas, the physician who delivered her. She announced a benefit concert to raise additional funds for the project. The concert played to about 8,000 people. That same year, Emmylou Harris and she had allowed their music to be used in a PETA ad campaign that encouraged pet owners to keep their dogs indoors rather than chained outside.

In 2003, her efforts to preserve the bald eagle through the American Eagle Foundation's sanctuary at Dollywood earned her the Partnership Award from the U.S. Fish and Wildlife Service. Parton received the Woodrow Wilson Award for Public Service from the Woodrow Wilson International Center for Scholars of the Smithsonian Institution at a ceremony in Nashville on November 8, 2007. In February 2018, in honor of her father, who never learned to read or write, she donated her 100 millionth free book, a copy of Parton's children's picture book Coat of Many Colors. It was donated to the Library of Congress in Washington, D.C.

For her work in literacy, Parton has received various awards, including Association of American Publishers Honors Award (2000), Good Housekeeping Seal of Approval (2001) (the first time the seal had been awarded to a person), American Association of School AdministratorsGalaxy Award (2002), National State Teachers of the YearChasing Rainbows Award (2002), and Parents as Teachers National CenterChild and Family Advocacy Award (2003).

On May 8, 2009, Parton gave the commencement speech at the graduation ceremony for the University of Tennessee, Knoxville's College of Arts and Sciences. During the ceremony, she received an honorary Doctor of Humane Letters from the university. It was only the second honorary degree given by the university, and in presenting the degree, the university's Chancellor, Jimmy Cheek, said, "Because of her career not just as a musician and entertainer, but for her role as a cultural ambassador, philanthropist and lifelong advocate for education, it is fitting that she be honored with an honorary degree from the flagship educational institution of her home state."

In response to the 2016 Great Smoky Mountains wildfires, Parton was one of a number of country music artists who participated in a telethon to raise money for victims of the fires. This was held in Nashville on December 9. In addition, Parton hosted her own telethon for the victims on December 13 and reportedly raised around $9million. Her fund, the "My People Fund", provided $1,000 a month for six months to over 900 families affected by the wildfires, finally culminating with $5,000 to each home in the final month due to increased fundraising, for a total of $10,000 per family. In 2018, the FBI honored Parton for her wildfire aid work, awarding her the 2018 Director’s Community Leadership Award at a ceremony at FBI Headquarters in Washington. The honor was bestowed by Director Christopher Wray and was accepted on the Parton’s behalf by David Dotson, the CEO of the Dollywood Foundation.

The impact of the fund's financial relief for the 2016 wildfire victims was studied by University of Tennessee College of Social Work professor Stacia West, who examined the impact of cash transfers in poverty alleviation. West surveyed 100 recipients of the emergency relief funds in April 2017 on topics including questions on housing, financial impact, physical and emotional health, and sources of support, with a follow up survey conducted in December 2017. West found that the "My People Fund", in tandem with traditional disaster response, gave families the ability to make decisions that were most beneficial to them, and concluded that unconditional cash support may be more beneficial for disaster relief than conditional financial support. The report cited the impact of the monthly financial disbursements from the "My People Fund" on residents' emergency savings: "Following the monthly disbursements of unconditional cash assistance, participants were able to return to baseline financial stability reported prior to the wildfire, and improve their ability to set aside savings for hypothetical future emergencies."

Parton has been a generous donor to Vanderbilt University Medical Center (VUMC). Among her gifts was a contribution to the Monroe Carell Jr. Children's Hospital at Vanderbilt Pediatric Cancer Program in honor of a friend, Professor Naji Abumrad, and her niece, Hannah Dennison, who was successfully treated for leukemia as a child at Children's Hospital.

Moderna COVID-19 vaccine
In response to the COVID-19 pandemic, Parton donated $1million towards research at Vanderbilt University Medical Center and encouraged those who can afford it to make similar donations. She said "I'm a very proud girl today to know I had anything at all to do with something that's going to help us through this crazy pandemic." Her donation funded the critical early stages of development of the Moderna vaccine. In March 2021, Parton was vaccinated against COVID-19 at Vanderbilt University. She labeled social media accounts of the occasion "Dolly gets a dose of her own medicine." Parton strongly encouraged everyone to get vaccinated when eligible and performed a song celebrating her vaccination, set to the tune of her song "Jolene". The song included the lines "Vaccine, vaccine, vaccine, vaccine/I'm begging of you please don't hesitate/Vaccine, vaccine, vaccine, vaccine/'Cos once you're dead, then that's a bit too late."

Awards and honors

Dolly Parton is one of the most-honored female country performers of all time. The Record Industry Association of America has certified 25 of her single or album releases as either Gold Record, Platinum Record or Multi-Platinum Record. She has had 26 songs reach no.1 on the Billboard country charts, a record for a female artist. She has 42 career Top10 country albums, a record for any artist, and 110 career-charted singles over the past forty years. As of 2012 she had written more than 3,000 songs and sold more than 100 million records, making her one of the best-selling female artists of all time. As of 2021, she had appeared on the country music charts in each of seven decades, the most of any artist.

Dolly Parton has earned eleven Grammy Awards (including her 2011 Lifetime Achievement Grammy) and a total of fifty Grammy Award nominations, the second-most nominations of any female artist in the history of the prestigious awards.

At the American Music Awards, she has won three awards out of 18 nominations. At the Country Music Association, she has won ten awards out of 42 nominations. At the Academy of Country Music, she has won seven awards and 39 nominations. She is one of only six female artists (including Reba McEntire, Barbara Mandrell, Shania Twain, Loretta Lynn, and Taylor Swift), to win the Country Music Association's highest honor, Entertainer of the Year (1978). She also has been nominated for two Academy Awards and a Tony Award. She was nominated for an Emmy Award for her appearance in a 1978 Cher television special. She was awarded a star on the Hollywood Walk of Fame for her music in 1984, located at 6712 Hollywood Boulevard in Hollywood, California; a star on the Nashville StarWalk for Grammy winners; and a bronze sculpture on the courthouse lawn in Sevierville. She has called that statue of herself in her hometown "the greatest honor", because it came from the people who knew her. Parton was inducted into the Grand Ole Opry in 1969, and in 1986 was named one of Ms. Magazine Women of the Year. In 1986, she was inducted into the Nashville Songwriters Hall of Fame.

In 1999, Parton received country music's highest honor, an induction into the Country Music Hall of Fame. She received an honorary doctorate degree from Carson-Newman College (Jefferson City, Tennessee) in 1990. This was followed by induction into the National Academy of Popular Music/Songwriters Hall of Fame in 2001. In 2002, she ranked no.4 in CMT's 40 Greatest Women of Country Music.

Parton was honored in 2003 with a tribute album called Just Because I'm a Woman: Songs of Dolly Parton. The artists who recorded versions of Parton's songs included Melissa Etheridge ("I Will Always Love You"), Alison Krauss ("9 to 5"), Shania Twain ("Coat of Many Colors"), Meshell Ndegeocello ("Two Doors Down"), Norah Jones ("The Grass is Blue"), and Sinéad O'Connor ("Dagger Through the Heart"). Parton herself contributed a re-recording of the title song, originally the title song for her first RCA album in 1968. Parton was awarded the Living Legend Medal by the U.S. Library of Congress on April 14, 2004, for her contributions to the cultural heritage of the United States. She is also the focus of a Library of Congress collection exploring the influences of country music on her life and career. The collection contains images, articles, sheet music, and more.

In 2005, she was honored with the National Medal of Arts, the highest honor given by the U.S. government for excellence in the arts. The award is presented by the U.S. President. On December 3, 2006, Parton received the Kennedy Center Honors from the John F. Kennedy Center for the Performing Arts for her lifetime of contributions to the arts. During the show, some of country music's biggest names came to show their admiration. Carrie Underwood performed "Islands in the Stream" with Rogers, Parton's original duet partner. Krauss performed "Jolene" and duetted "Coat of Many Colors" with Twain. McEntire and Reese Witherspoon also came to pay tribute. On November 16, 2010, Parton accepted the Liseberg Applause Award, the theme park industry's most prestigious honor, on behalf of Dollywood theme park during a ceremony held at IAAPA Attractions Expo 2010 in Orlando, Florida.

In 2015, a newly discovered species of lichen found growing in the southern Appalachians was named Japewiella dollypartoniana in honor of Parton's music and her efforts to bring national and global attention to that region. In 2018, Parton received a second star on the Hollywood Walk of Fame, inducted alongside Linda Ronstadt and Emmylou Harris in recognition of their work as a trio. Parton was also recognized in the Guinness World Records 2018 Edition for holding records for the Most Decades with a Top20 hit on Billboard's Hot Country Songs Chart and Most Hits on Billboard's Hot Country Songs Chart by a Female Artist. In 2020, Parton received a Grammy award for her collaboration with For King & Country on their song, "God Only Knows". In 2021, she was included on the Time 100, Times annual list of the 100 most influential people in the world.

Parton has turned down the Presidential Medal of Freedom twice due to her husband's illness and the ongoing pandemic. In response to a 2021 proposal by the Tennessee legislature to erect a statue of Parton, she released a statement asking the legislature to remove the bill from consideration, saying "Given all that is going on in the world, I don't think putting me on a pedestal is appropriate at this time."

In late 2022, Parton received a $100-million Courage and Civility Award from the founder of Amazon, Jeff Bezos. According to Bezos, the award was given to Parton because of her charity work focused on improving children's literacy around the world.

Hall of Fame honors
During her career, Parton has gained induction into numerous Halls of Fame. Those honors include:
 Nashville Songwriters Hall of Fame (1986)
 Small Town of America Hall of Fame (1988)
 East Tennessee Hall of Fame (1988)
 Country Music Hall of Fame (1999)
 Songwriters Hall of Fame (2001)
 Junior Achievement of East Tennessee Business Hall of Fame (2003)
 The Americana Highway Hall of Fame (2006)
 Grammy Hall of Fame – "I Will Always Love You – 1974 Recording" (2007)
 Blue Ridge Music Hall of Fame – Songwriter Category (2008)
 Gospel Music Hall of Fame (2009)
 Music City Walk of Fame (2009)
 Country Gospel Music Hall of Fame (2010)
 Grammy Hall of Fame – "Jolene – 1974 Recording" (2014)
 The National Hall of Fame for Mountain Artisans (2014)
 The Happiness Hall of Fame (2016)
 East Tennessee Writers Hall of Fame (2019)
 Grammy Hall of Fame – "Coat of Many Colors – 1971 Recording" (2019)
 Rock and Roll Hall of Fame (2022)

Discography

Studio albums

Hello, I'm Dolly (1967)
Just Between You and Me  (1968)
Just Because I'm a Woman (1968)
Just the Two of Us  (1968)
In the Good Old Days (When Times Were Bad) (1969)
Always, Always  (1969)
My Blue Ridge Mountain Boy (1969)
The Fairest of Them All (1970)
Porter Wayne and Dolly Rebecca  (1970)
Once More  (1970)
Two of a Kind  (1971)
The Golden Streets of Glory (1971)
Joshua (1971)
Coat of Many Colors (1971)
The Right Combination • Burning the Midnight Oil  (1972)
Touch Your Woman (1972)
Together Always  (1972)
My Favorite Songwriter, Porter Wagoner (1972)
We Found It  (1973)
My Tennessee Mountain Home (1973)
Love and Music  (1973)
Bubbling Over (1973)
Jolene (1974)
Porter 'n' Dolly  (1974)
Love Is Like a Butterfly (1974)
The Bargain Store (1975)
Say Forever You'll Be Mine  (1975)
Dolly (1975)
All I Can Do (1976)
New Harvest...First Gathering (1977)
Here You Come Again (1977)
Heartbreaker (1978)
Great Balls of Fire (1979)
Dolly, Dolly, Dolly (1980)
Porter & Dolly  (1980)
9 to 5 and Odd Jobs (1980)
Heartbreak Express (1982)
Burlap & Satin (1983)
The Great Pretender (1984)
Once Upon a Christmas  (1984)
Real Love (1985)
Trio  (1987)
Rainbow (1987)
White Limozeen (1989)
Home for Christmas (1990)
Eagle When She Flies (1991)
Slow Dancing with the Moon (1993)
Honky Tonk Angels  (1993)
Something Special (1995)
Treasures (1996)
Hungry Again (1998)
Trio II  (1999)
Precious Memories (1999)
The Grass Is Blue (1999)
Little Sparrow (2001)
Halos & Horns (2002)
For God and Country (2003)
Those Were the Days (2005)
Backwoods Barbie (2008)
Better Day (2011)
Blue Smoke (2014)
Pure & Simple (2016)
I Believe in You (2017)
A Holly Dolly Christmas (2020)
Run, Rose, Run (2022)
Rock Star (2023)

Filmography

Theatrical releases
9 to 5 (1980)
The Best Little Whorehouse in Texas (1982)
Rhinestone (1984)
Steel Magnolias (1989)
Straight Talk (1992)
Frank McKlusky, C.I. (2002)
Gnomeo & Juliet (2011)
Joyful Noise (2012)

Published works
 
 
 
 
 
 
 
 Run, Rose, Run  (2022)

See also

Chasing Rainbows Museum
List of American film actresses
List of American television actresses
List of country music performers
List of composers of musicals
List of people from Tennessee
List of philanthropists
List of singer-songwriters

References

Bibliography

Further reading
 
 
 
 
 
 
 Smarsh, Sarah (October 2020) She Come by it Natural: Dolly Parton and the Woman Who Lived Her Songs Scribner

External links

 
 
 "Dolly Parton" , inductee page at Country Music Hall of Fame and Museum

 
1946 births
20th-century American actresses
20th-century American businesspeople
20th-century American businesswomen
20th-century American composers
20th-century American guitarists
20th-century American singers
20th-century American women guitarists
20th-century American women singers
20th-century American women writers
20th-century women composers
21st-century American actresses
21st-century American businesspeople
21st-century American businesswomen
21st-century American composers
21st-century American memoirists
21st-century American non-fiction writers
21st-century American singers
21st-century American women singers
21st-century American women writers
21st-century women composers
Actresses from Tennessee
American Christians
American conservationists
American country singer-songwriters
American entertainment industry businesspeople
American women country singers
American women pop singers
American women singer-songwriters
American film actresses
American memoirists
American musical theatre composers
American musical theatre lyricists
American people of Welsh descent
American sopranos
American street performers
American television actresses
American voice actresses
American women environmentalists
American women memoirists
American women philanthropists
American women television personalities
Audiobook narrators
Businesspeople from Tennessee
Christians from Tennessee
Country Music Hall of Fame inductees
Country musicians from Tennessee
Country pop musicians
Decca Records artists
Feminist musicians
Grammy Award winners
Grammy Lifetime Achievement Award winners
Grand Ole Opry members
Kennedy Center honorees
Literacy advocates
Living people
Mercury Records artists
Monument Records artists
Music of East Tennessee
Musicians from Appalachia
People from Sevierville, Tennessee
Philanthropists from Tennessee
Primetime Emmy Award winners
RCA Records Nashville artists
Singer-songwriters from Tennessee
Sugar Hill Records artists
United States National Medal of Arts recipients
Writers from Tennessee